Bareqi Arabic is one of the five major varieties of Arabic spoken in Saudi Arabia. It is spoken in many towns and villages in and around Bareq.

Characteristics
Bareqi Arabic has many aspects that differentiate it from all other dialects in the Arab world. Phonologically, Bareqi Arabic is similar to the majority of Saudi Arabia dialects and Himyaritic language. All Bareqi dialects also share the unusual feature of replacing the definite article al- with the prefix am-. The dialects of many towns and villages in the wadi and the coastal region are characterized by having changed ج to a palatal approximant ي  (called  yodization).

References

References 
The information in this article is based on that in its Arabic equivalent.

Arabic languages
Arabs in Saudi Arabia
Mashriqi Arabic
Peninsular Arabic
Languages of Saudi Arabia